Marijampolė Football Arena, also referred to as Hikvision Arena or Sūduva Stadium, is a multi-purpose stadium in Marijampolė, Lithuania. It is currently used mostly for football matches and is the home stadium of Sūduva.

Between the 2011 and 2019 seasons the stadium was named ARVI Football Arena after the sponsoring rights were bought by ARVI Enterprises Group.

The stadium was built using funds from the European Union and opened on July 6, 2008. Its original capacity increased from 4,200 to 6,500 spectators after additional seats were installed in May–June 2009 before a match between Lithuania national team and Romania.

11 December 2019 reports were published that ARVI Group will no longer support Sūduva club. There were notes and signboards bearing the name of a former sponsor. The ARVI Arena has been renamed the Marijampolė Football Arena. On 14 January 2020 FK Sūduva announced about new general sponsor Hikvision and renaming the stadium into Hikvision arena.

Also
 Marijampolė Football Indoor Arena
 FK Sūduva Marijampolė

References

External links
 Official website (Sūduva Stadium)
 alyga.lt official page
 Stadiums in Lithuania. Worldstadiums.com.

Football venues in Lithuania
Multi-purpose stadiums in Lithuania
Sports venues completed in 2008
Buildings and structures in Marijampolė